Last Chance is an unincorporated community in Washington County, Colorado, United States.  Last Chance is situated at the intersection of U.S. Highway 36 and State Highway 71 in a sparsely populated area of northeastern Colorado.  The town was supposedly so named because it was once the only place for travelers to secure fuel and provisions for many miles in any direction.  The U.S. Post Office at Woodrow (ZIP Code 80757) now serves Last Chance postal addresses.

Hee Haw saluted Last Chance, Colorado (pop. 25) on Nov 16, 1974.

Geography
Last Chance is located at  (39.739930,-103.593693).

1993 tornadoes
On July 21, 1993 between 7:00 and 8:45, 5 tornadoes touched down in the Last Chance, Lindon area. The strongest was an F3. There were 2 F1s and 2 F0s. The tornadoes did not kill or cause any injury but several farms were destroyed.

2012 Wildfire
On Monday June 25, 2012 a wildfire that started from sparks caused by a flat tire of a passing motorist on Washington County Road №7 burned much of the town, leaving only a few charred structures standing, including the United Methodist Church. By the morning of Tuesday June 26, 2012 the blaze had been stopped, but not before burning 45,000 acres between Last Chance and Woodrow, Colorado - the nearest community. Last Chance and Woodrow had to be evacuated during the blaze, but residents were allowed to return on June 26. Firefighters from fire departments in Brush, Hillrose, Snyder, Merino, Fort Morgan, Seibert, Burlington, Stratton, Flagler, Idalia, Joes, Sterling, Akron and Bennett as well as Colorado Department of Transportation Crews battled the blaze through the night, allowing for the lift of the evacuations.

See also
 State of Colorado
 U.S. Highway 36
 Washington County, Colorado

References

Unincorporated communities in Washington County, Colorado
Unincorporated communities in Colorado